Oystein Olsen may refer to:

Øystein Olsen (bishop) (born 1944), Norwegian Methodist bishop
Øystein Olsen (economist) (born 1952), Norwegian economist and academic
Øystein Olsen (ice hockey) (born 1969), Norwegian ice hockey player

See also
Olsen (surname)